Beier is a German surname. Notable people with the surname include:

 Albert Beier (1900–1972), German footballer
 Carol A. Beier, Kansas Supreme Court Justice
 Christina Beier (born 1984), German ice dancer, sister of William Beier
 Emil Beier (1893–1985), German Nazi politician and Mayor of Ostrava, Czechoslovakia
 Eugene Beier (born 1940), American physicist
 Karin Beier (born 1965), German theatre director
 Max Beier (1903–1979), Austrian arachnologist
 Priidu Beier (born 1957), Estonian poet and teacher
 Tom Beier (born 1945), former American football safety
 Ulli Beier (born 1922), German editor, writer and scholar
 William Beier (born 1982), German ice dancer, brother of Christina Beier

See also
 Beier variable-ratio gear, a mechanical drive
 Beyer

German-language surnames
German toponymic surnames
Ethnonymic surnames